Heterospilus is a genus of braconid wasps in the family Braconidae. There are at least 130 described species in Heterospilus.

See also
 List of Heterospilus species

References

Further reading

External links

 

Parasitic wasps